The Great Dane is a nickname which may refer to:

 Daniel Agger (born 1984), retired Danish football defender
 Morten Andersen (born 1960), Danish-American National Football League kicker
 Victor Borge (1909–2000), Danish comedian, entertainer and pianist
 Gus Hansen (born 1974), Danish professional poker player
 Tom Kristensen (racing driver) (born 1967), Danish sportscar racing driver
 Lauritz Melchior (1890–1973), Danish-American operatic tenor
 Nils Middelboe (1887–1976), Danish football attacker
 Jan Mølby (born 1963), retired Danish football midfielder
 Brigitte Nielsen (born 1963), Danish actress
 Peter Schmeichel (born 1963), retired Danish football goalkeeper

See also
Great Dane, a breed of dog
Albany Great Danes, the athletic program of the University at Albany
Great Dane Trailers, manufacturer of commercial semitrailers
Great Dane Airlines, a Danish startup airline

Lists of people by nickname
Nicknames in sports
Nicknames in association football
Nicknames in film
Nicknames in entertainment
Nicknames in music